Paul K. Friedhoff (February 2, 1943 – November 15, 2015) was a German politician of the Free Democratic Party (FDP) and former member of the German Bundestag.

Life 
Friedhoff became a member of the German Bundestag after the federal elections in 1990 and also moved back into the Bundestag after the federal elections in 1994 and 1998.  From 2005 to 2012 he was again a member of the Bundestag. He was a member of the Bundestag's economic committee and there he was chairman of the FDP. On 30 April 2012, he resigned his mandate for health reasons.

Literature

References

1943 births
2015 deaths
Members of the Bundestag for North Rhine-Westphalia
Members of the Bundestag 2009–2013
Members of the Bundestag 2005–2009
Members of the Bundestag 1998–2002
Members of the Bundestag 1994–1998
Members of the Bundestag 1990–1994
Members of the Bundestag for the Free Democratic Party (Germany)